Gordon Bell High School is a public junior and senior high school in Winnipeg, Manitoba, Canada. It is located in the inner city of Winnipeg. The school is bordered by the trans-Canada highway on Broadway Street and Maryland Street.

History
The school was founded in 1926 and is named after Dr. Gordon Bell, a physician and educator.

Notable alumni
Adam Beach, actor
Jack Bowman, physician, medical researcher, and professor of medicine
Andy Frost, disc jockey
Marion Lewis, medical researcher and professor of medicine
Sierra Noble, singer
Murray Peden, lawyer
Carl Ridd, professional basketball player

References

External links
 Gordon Bell High School's official website

High schools in Winnipeg
Educational institutions established in 1926
1926 establishments in Manitoba
Schools in downtown Winnipeg